Metal Gear Solid, released in Japan as  is a 2000 action-adventure stealth video game developed and published by Konami for the Game Boy Color. Tose assisted on development after they were commissioned by Konami's European branch to develop a portable adaptation of their 1998 PlayStation game of the same title. However, the Game Boy Color version is not a port of the original PlayStation version, nor does it adapt the same story, but instead takes place in an alternative continuity set seven years after the events of the original Metal Gear (1987).

Gameplay

Ghost Babel follows the overhead 2D format used in the 1990 MSX2 game Metal Gear 2: Solid Snake while adding a few new elements introduced in Metal Gear Solid. As with previous games in the series, the objective is to infiltrate the enemy's stronghold while avoiding detection from guards or surveillance systems. The player can acquire numerous items and weapons to help them fulfill their mission. One difference from the MSX2 games is that the screen now scrolls when Snake moves throughout a single area instead of using flip-screens. Moreover, all the characters in the game now move in eight directions, allowing both the player and the enemies to move diagonally in addition to the four cardinal directions.

Snake now has the ability to flatten himself into walls like he does in Metal Gear Solid. By flattening himself, Snake can move across the wall (allowing him access to tight passages that are not accessible by walking), scroll the camera behind his position to scout the area ahead, or knock the wall to lure nearby enemy soldiers. Depending on the difficulty, the number of punches required to defeat an enemy soldier differs and in the higher difficulty levels, the enemy soldiers will be knocked unconscious for a while after the first series of punches instead of simply being defeated. Crawling is now assigned to the Start button (instead of pressing two buttons simultaneously) and the changing of weapons and equipment is done on the main game screen rather than on separate sub-screens. Like in previous installments, the player communicates with various allies via a wireless communication device (the Codec), which is also used to save the player's progress.

Unlike the preceding installments, Ghost Babel uses a stage-based structure, with a total of 13 stages. After completing a stage, the player's performance is graded from "Terrible" to "Excellent". Much like in the original Metal Gear Solid, the player's overall performance is graded with a codename after completing all 13 stages, with the codenames varying depending on the difficulty level chosen at the start of the game.

Game modes
In addition to the main story mode, Ghost Babel offers the following alternate game modes.
Stage Select
Allows the player to replay previously cleared stages in order to achieve a higher ranking. After the Story mode is completed, "Special" versions of the stages become available where the player must achieve new objectives (such as collecting FOXHOUND emblems or reach the goal without being seen). In this Special training mode, the player controls an unknown agent who goes through a VR recreation of Snake's mission in Galuade, while being supervised by a mysterious entity named "No.4." As the player clears more of these stages, No.4 will disclose details of the game's story not revealed in the main campaign.
VR Training
180 training missions spread across three main categories (sneaking, weapon and advanced) and various sub-categories within each. Most of the missions are recreations of the ones featured in Metal Gear Solid: Integral
Vs. Battle
A competitive 2-player mode that requires a Game Link Cable, along with an additional Game Boy Color unit and a second copy of the game cartridge. The objective in this mode is to destroy three target drones called WISPs in order to obtain the data disks they carry and access the goal before the other player does. One player controls Snake in his standard sneaking suit, while the other Snake wears a red sneaking suit. The two Snakes are invisible to each other, unless one of them enters the field of vision of the other.

Plot
Seven years after the Outer Heaven uprising, a new Metal Gear prototype (codenamed Gander) has been stolen by a separatist guerrilla group in the region of Gindra in Central Africa. The Gindra Liberation Front (or GLF), led by the mercenary Augustine Eguabon, plans on using the prototype as a means of achieving victory in an ongoing civil war. Solid Snake, the FOXHOUND operative responsible for the destruction of the original Metal Gear seven years before, is brought back from his retirement in Alaska. His mission is to infiltrate the group's headquarters Galuade, the fortress that was formerly Outer Heaven. 

During the course of his mission, Snake teams up with Sgt. Christine Jenner, a surviving member of the Delta Force that was sent before him to retrieve Gander. The GLF are assisted by four surviving members of Black Chamber, a defunct special forces unit whose members are given animal-themed codenames similar to FOXHOUND. They are led by Black Arts Viper, a boobytrap specialist who wields a prosthetic left arm. Joining him are Slasher Hawk, an Australian Aborigine armed with two giant boomerangs who is accompanied in battle by a hawk; Marionette Owl, a former serial killer endowed with owl-like nocturnal vision and attacks with his two bunraku puppets; and Pyro Bison, a pyromaniac armed with a specially prepared flamethrower and fuel pack. As Snake goes deeper into Galuade and confronts each member of Black Chamber, he uncovers a conspiracy involving the GLF and US Government.

IdeaSpy 2.5
IdeaSpy 2.5 is a bonus 13-part story written by Shuyo Murata featured in the Japanese and European versions of Ghost Babel. The player has access to this story by going to the CODEC screen during the second play-through and onward by contacting frequency 140.07 on each stage. The story is written like a satirical [radio drama|radio play]:

"New York. Here in the city where dreams come true and desires rule, Something is being bought, sold, and thrown away, even as we speak. But behind the scenes of business as usual. the nefarious J.E (Junker Expensive) Corporation lines it already bloated coffers With profits from worthless products. As J.E swindles yet another innocent into purchasing High-priced junk, The FBI mobilizes a top-secret task force to put a stop to the menace. Now, the city's best-kept secret spy is out there, Briefed; and ready to protect the people from J.E., the catalogue of conspiracy... Just call him 2.5 (Two-Point-Five)

In 2006, Idea Spy 2.5 was adapted into an actual radio drama streamed on Hideo Kojima's Japanese podcast, with Kojima himself playing the title role. Shuyo Murata also plays one of the boss characters. The full drama was released on CD in Japan on February 14, 2007.

Development
The game was produced under the request of Konami's European division to release a Game Boy Color version of Metal Gear Solid. The game's director, Shinta Nojiri, would later go on to direct Metal Gear Acid and its sequel, Metal Gear Acid 2, both released for the PlayStation Portable, while character designer Ikuya Nakamura went on to direct the Boktai series on Game Boy Advance and Nintendo DS.

Reception

The game received overall critical acclaim. It has an average rating of 95.61% at GameRankings, making it the best-rated game for the Game Boy Color on the site.

Japanese video game magazine Famitsu scored Metal Gear: Ghost Babel a 31 out of 40.

Legacy
Nintendo Power listed it as the 11th best Game Boy/Game Boy Color video game, praising it for successfully bringing over elements from the three dimensional games. Ben Reeves from Game Informer called it the eighth best Game Boy game and considered it a good throwback to the MSX2. GamesRadar listed Metal Gear Solid for Game Boy Color as one of the titles they would like to see on the Nintendo 3DS Virtual Console.

Indie video game developer Butterfly, stated that the overall feel and aesthetic of Metal Gear Solid for Game Boy Color inspired their Nintendo 3DS game Gal Galaxy Pain.

Notes

References

External links
Official homepage

2000 video games
Game Boy Color games
Game Boy Color-only games
Multiplayer and single-player video games
Video games developed in Japan
Video games produced by Hideo Kojima
Video games set in a fictional country
Tose (company) games
Metal Gear spin-off games

de:Metal Gear#Metal Gear Ghost Babel